Michael Casson OBE (2 April 1925 - 12 December 2003) born in London, was an English studio potter, referred to as "respected and charismatic".

He studied art and woodwork at Shoreditch College, and ceramics at Hornsey College of Art, and was one of the founding potters of the Craft Potters Association, a co-operative that acquired a shop and gallery in central London in 1958.

In 1976, Casson devised and presented "The Craft of the Potter" for the BBC a series that involved practical demonstrations and discussion about the craft of the potter.

See also 
Studio pottery

References

External links
 Michael Casson obituary

1925 births
2003 deaths
Officers of the Order of the British Empire
Artists from London
English potters
English television presenters
20th-century ceramists